Evert Jan Ligtelijn, pseudonym Luciénte, (13 November 1893, in Amsterdam – 26 December 1975, Laren) was a Dutch painter.

References

External links

1893 births
1975 deaths
Dutch landscape painters
Dutch male painters
People from Amsterdam